Susi Fortun-Lohrmann (born 27 March 1973) is a German former professional tennis player.

Biography
Born in Sankt Georgen, Lohrmann was a right-handed player who competed on the professional tour in the 1990s and early 2000s. Her best performance on the WTA Tour was a third round appearance Stratton Mountain in 1993, which included a win over the sixth seeded player Chanda Rubin. She reached a career-high singles ranking of 196 in the world and won six singles titles and four doubles titles on the ITF Women's Circuit.

Lohrmann, who lives in Leonberg, has been married to tennis player Martin Fortun since 2008.

She is a highly ranked player on the ITF senior's circuit, currently competing in the 45 age group.

ITF finals

Singles (6–2)

Doubles (4–1)

References

External links
 
 

1973 births
Living people
West German female tennis players
German female tennis players
People from Schwarzwald-Baar-Kreis
Sportspeople from Freiburg (region)
Tennis people from Baden-Württemberg